Sponsor  is a 2022 South Korean television series starring Lee Ji-hoon, Han Chae-young, Ji Yi-soo and Koo Ja-Sung. The drama is described as another Penthouse. It was scheduled to premiere on iHQ on November 29, 2021 but postponed to February 2022 with a plan to  simultaneous air on MBN along with iHQ. It premiered on MBN simultaneously with iHQ from February 23, 2022.

Synopsis 
A romance thriller between four men and women running like a runaway locomotive toward different desires, including success, revenge, children and love.

Cast

Main 
 Lee Ji-hoon as Lee Sun-woo
 Han Chae-young as Han Chae-rin
 Ji Yi-soo as Park Da-som
 Koo Ja-sung as Hyun Seung-hoon

Supporting 
 Kim Yoon-seo as Hyun Sung-gi, Seung-hun's older sister.
 Kim Kang-hyun as Kang-hyun
 Park Geun-hyung as President Park
 Kim Jung-tae as David Park
 Lee Yoon-mi as Joo-ah , David Park's ex-wife and store representative. 
 Han Seul
 Kim Hee-jung as Park Da-hye the younger sister of Park Da-som and an employee of the beauty product development team.
Jang Min-kyu as Han Yu-min, Han Chae-rin's younger brother
 Jo Hyo-in as  Joo Young-chan, ambitious model

Special appearance 
Park Joon-geum as President Lee
Eru as Michael

Production

Development 
 Originally, the series title was Desire, but the title was changed to Sponsor as the director was changed from PD Kwak Ki-won to PD Lee Cheol. The writer was also changed to Han Hui-Jeung.
 President Park Jong-jin told iHQ, “The series is very realistic because it is based on a true story.
 The drama is the first project of the new channel.

Ratings

References

External links 
  
 
 

Maeil Broadcasting Network television dramas
2022 South Korean television series debuts 
2022 South Korean television series endings
Television series by IHQ (company)
Television series by Victory Contents